Myinodes is a genus of moths in the family Geometridae described by Edward Meyrick in 1892.

Species
Myinodes interpunctaria (Herrich-Schäffer, 1839) north-eastern Algeria, Tunisia, southern Italy
Myinodes constantina Hausmann, 1994 northern Africa
Myinodes shohami Hausmann, 1994 Turkey, Syria, Lebanon, Israel, Jordan, northern Iraq, western Iran, Libya, Algeria

References

Oenochrominae